Verrado is a master-planned community located in the city of Buckeye, Arizona, approximately  west of downtown Phoenix. The development, at the base of the White Tank Mountains,  is the largest suburban community in Metropolitan Phoenix in which the concept of New Urbanism was utilized.  It is planned to contain over 14,000 dwelling units at full build out.  Verrado is a DMB Associates, Inc. development.

Main Street District 
The development features an "old-town America" inspired Main Street at the core of the community with shopping, restaurants, residential services, and multi-family homes. As of June 2020, the business present in the Main Street District include the following:

Barbershop on Main
Bashas' on Main Street
Blue Daisy Day Spa and Salon
Ciao Grazie Pizzeria & Wine Bar
CVS Pharmacy
DMB White Tank
Ebb + Flow Coffee Co.
Edward Jones
Empower Physical Therapy
Ganyo Insurance Agency
Gill Law Firm
Johnson Wealth Management
Justin Thrasher Agency (American Family Insurance)
Main Street Aesthetics
Main Street Dental
Majestic Beauty Spa, PLLC
Nemechek Autonomic Medicine
Orange Leaf Frozen Yogurt
Pioneer Title
Sol Power Solutions
Tempo Urban Bistro
Verrado Assembly/Verrado Community Association
Verrado Realty
Vision Wellness
V-Town Designs
906 Wellness

Neighborhoods 
Verrado's townhouses and single-family residences radiate from the Main Street District. The design of these neighborhoods was based on that of American neighborhoods of the early twentieth century, including those of nearby Phoenix's historic districts. Some homes feature garages that are accessed from a rear alley rather than from the street to provide for a more traditional street-scape.  Neighborhood amenities include a community center, a swim park, a golf course, 78 community parks, a dog park, and 21 miles of paths and hiking trails.

Victory at Verrado 
Victory is an age-restricted district (55 years of age and older) within the all-ages community of Verrado. The Victory District is in the northern section of Verrado and is located in the foothills of the White Tank Mountain range.  It will include 3,000 homes at full build-out.

Education 
Verrado is situated within 3 school districts:  Litchfield Elementary School District #79, Agua Fria Union High School District #216 and Saddle Mountain Unified School District #90.  The community currently contains three schools, in addition to the Goddard School for Early Childhood Development (ages 6 months-6 years).
The Goddard School (Pre-school)
Verrado Elementary School (Pre-school and grades K-5) 
Verrado Middle School (Grades 6-8)
Heritage K-8  (Grades K-8)
Verrado High School (Grades 9-12)

References

External links 
 
Agua Fria Union High School District #216
Litchfield Elementary School District #79

Victory at Veraddo

Populated places in Maricopa County, Arizona
Planned communities in the United States
New Urbanism communities